Cristina Sandu (born 4 March 1990) is a Romanian athlete who competes in the long jump and the triple jump. She won the silver medal at the 2009 European Junior Championships. In addition, she represented her country at two outdoor and two indoor European Championships.

Competition record

Personal bests
Outdoor
Long jump – 6.53 (0.0 m/s) (Pátra 2009)
Triple jump – 13.99 (+0.4 m/s) (Cluj-Napoca 2014)
Indoor
Long jump – 6.54 (Bucharest 2011)
Triple jump – 13.97 (Prague 2015)

References

1990 births
Living people
Romanian female long jumpers
Romanian female triple jumpers
Competitors at the 2013 Summer Universiade